The 2004 Cincinnati Bearcats football team represented the University of Cincinnati in the 2004 NCAA Division I-A football season. The team, coached by Mark Dantonio, played its home games in Nippert Stadium, as it has since 1924. This was the Bearcats last season in Conference USA as they became members of the Big East Conference after the academic year.

Schedule

Awards and milestones

Conference USA honors

Offensive player of the week
Week 2: Richard Hall
Week 9: Gino Guidugli
Week 11: Gino Guidugli

Defensive player of the week
Week 4: Trent Cole
Week 8: Andre Frazier

Special teams player of the week
Week 8: Chet Ervin

All-Conference USA First Team

Kyle Takavitz, OG

Trent Cole, DE
Andre Frazier, DE

All-Conference USA Second Team

Brent Celek, TE
Hannibal Thomas, WR

Jamar Enzor, LB
Daven Holly, DB
Doug Monaghan, DB

All-Conference USA Third Team

Richard Hall, RB
Clint Stickdorn, OT

Tyjuan Hagler, LB

All-Conference USA Freshman Team
Anthony Hoke, DE
Doug Jones, FB

Players in the 2005 NFL Draft

References

Cincinnati
Cincinnati Bearcats football seasons
Armed Forces Bowl champion seasons
Cincinnati Bearcats football